The FSCC Early Cash was a bonspiel, or curling tournament, that took place at the Four Seasons Curling Club in Blaine, Minnesota. The tournament was held in a round robin format. The tournament started in 2013 as part of the World Curling Tour and the Great Lakes Curling Tour. In 2014, the September WCT event in Blaine, Minnesota was called the Twin Cities Open and was open to both genders. The event was discontinued after that.

Past champions
Only skip's name is displayed.

Men

Women

References

External links
Four Seasons Curling Club Home

Former World Curling Tour events
Women's World Curling Tour events
Sports in Minneapolis–Saint Paul
Curling in Minnesota
2013 establishments in Minnesota
2014 disestablishments in Minnesota
Recurring sporting events established in 2013
Recurring sporting events disestablished in 2014